Zawodzie is a district of Katowice. It has an area of 4 km2 and in 2007 had 13,406 inhabitants.

References

Districts of Katowice